Alaric Kormu Tokpa is a Liberian politician and political scientist. He ran alongside George Klay Kieh in the New Deal Movement and, as a pair, received 0.5% of the vote in the 11 October 2005 presidential election. Tokpa has been pursuing a Ph.D. at Clark Atlanta University. As of 2002, Tokpa was the acting Chairman of the Department of Political Science at the University of Liberia.

References

Living people
Clark Atlanta University alumni
Year of birth missing (living people)
New Deal Movement politicians
University of Liberia alumni
Liberian politicians
Academic staff of the University of Liberia